This is a list of number-one songs in the United States during the year 1957 according to Billboard magazine. Prior to the creation of the Billboard Hot 100, Billboard published multiple singles charts each week. In 1957, the following four charts were produced:

Best Sellers in Stores – ranked the biggest selling singles in retail stores, as reported by merchants surveyed throughout the country.
Most Played by Jockeys – ranked the most played songs on United States radio stations, as reported by radio disc jockeys and radio stations.
Most Played in Jukeboxes – ranked the most played songs in jukeboxes across the United States (this chart was discontinued in June 1957).
Top 100 - an early version of the Hot 100, the first chart to feature a combined tabulation of sales, airplay and jukebox play.

NOTE: Billboard changed its issue dates from a Saturday to a Monday schedule on April 29, thus causing a one-week inconsistency. This would later be changed back from a Monday to a Saturday schedule on January 6, 1962.

See also
1957 in music

1957
United States Singles